Polkadot is an unincorporated community in Lincoln County, North Carolina, United States.

References

Unincorporated communities in North Carolina
Unincorporated communities in Lincoln County, North Carolina